Brewcaria duidensis is a species of plants in the genus Brewcaria. This species is endemic to Venezuela.

References

duidensis
Flora of Venezuela